León Bozzi (17 June 1928 – 16 March 1987) was an Argentine sports shooter. He competed in the trap event at the 1956 Summer Olympics, where he finished 28th.

References

External links
 

1928 births
1987 deaths
Argentine male sport shooters
Olympic shooters of Argentina
Shooters at the 1956 Summer Olympics
Place of birth missing